A light commercial vehicle (LCV) in the European Union, Australia and New Zealand is a commercial carrier vehicle with a gross vehicle weight of no more than 3.5 metric tons (tonnes). The LCV designation is also occasionally used in both Canada and Ireland (where the term commercial van is more commonly used).

Qualifying light commercial vehicles include pickup trucks, vans and three-wheelers – all commercially based goods or passenger carrier vehicles. The LCV concept was created as a compact truck and is usually optimised to be tough-built, have low operating costs and powerful yet fuel efficient engines, and to be used in intra-city operations.

Examples

BYD
BYD M3 DM
BYD T3
BYD Shang
Citroën
Jumper
Jumpy
Berlingo
Nemo
Dacia
Dokker
Daihatsu
Hijet
Fiat
Ducato
Doblò
Scudo
Fiorino
Ford 
Econovan
Transit
Transit Connect
Transit Courier
Transit Custom
GAZ
Sobol
GAZelle
GAZelle NEXT
Iveco
Daily

Hyundai
Grace
Starex
iLoad
iMax
H350
Porter
Maxus
V80
Mazda
Bongo
E-series
Mercedes-Benz
Sprinter
Vito
Citan
Mini
Clubvan
Nissan
NV200
NV300
Cabstar
NV400
NV350 Caravan
Mitsubishi
Delica
L300
L200
Opel
Vivaro
Movano A/B
Movano C
Combo

Peugeot
Boxer
Partner
Rifter
Expert
Bipper
Piaggio
Ape
Porter
Renault
Trafic
Master
Maxity
Kangoo
Škoda
Praktik 
Tata Motors
Ace
Winger
Yodha
Toyota
HiAce
LiteAce
ProAce
TownAce
Volkswagen
Caddy
Transporter
Crafter
LT

Sales channels
All of the above light commercial vehicles are sold through dealer networks. Usually, a car dealer will have a franchise for the sale of a manufacturer's cars and the LCVs will be sold as an addition. The exceptions to these are Mercedes-Benz, which has a dedicated commercial vehicle network for heavy and light commercial vehicles, Volkswagen, whose franchised dealers usually have standalone van centres, Iveco, and Isuzu Truck. Isuzu Truck market commercial vehicles up to 18 tonnes GVW and Iveco market their heavy truck range with their Daily van to complement this.

Marketing
Many franchised dealers also retail used LCVs, with the poorer quality examples sent to specialist auctions for sale.  There is a large network of independent used commercial vehicle retailers who retail thousands of used commercial vehicles every month. LCV dealers are increasingly using the Internet to help sell their vehicles in addition to the traditional print media.

See also
 Enhanced environmentally friendly vehicle
 Light Haulage
 Truck classification

References

Commercial vehicles